The United States Army Engineer Research and Development Laboratory (ERDL) was a United States Army Corps of Engineers research facility located at Fort Belvoir, Virginia.

History
The ERDL was formed in 1947 when the Army's Engineer Board was redesignated as the U.S. Engineer Research and Development Laboratory, or ERDL.

Army Equipment Development milestones 
Among other things, the ERDL was responsible for the creation of the ERDLator water treatment device in World War II, the ERDL woodland camouflage pattern in 1948, and the updated M1950 lensatic compass. 

The ERDL also established the first U.S. Army research group dedicated to night vision systems in 1954, called the Research and Photometric Section.

Sources

Fairfax County, Virginia
Engineer Research and Development Laboratory
Military installations in Virginia